Theodore S. Meekins House is a historic home located at Manteo, Dare County, North Carolina.  The original one-story section, now the kitchen ell, was built in 1904.  Between 1910 and 1912, the -story, Queen Anne style main section was added.  It features a three-story corner tower and one-story wraparound porch.

It was listed on the National Register of Historic Places in 1982.

References

Houses on the National Register of Historic Places in North Carolina
Queen Anne architecture in North Carolina
Houses completed in 1912
Houses in Dare County, North Carolina
National Register of Historic Places in Dare County, North Carolina
1912 establishments in North Carolina
Roanoke Island